Newbold is a neighborhood 
in South Philadelphia. Its boundaries are Broad Street on the east, 18th Street on the west, Washington Avenue on the north, and Passyunk Avenue on the south.

Developer John Longacre (owner of the South Philadelphia Taproom, American Sardine Bar, Brew, 2nd District, and Renewbold) dubbed the neighborhood "Newbold" in 2003. Longacre drew inspiration for the name from the original name of Hicks Street.  Soon he formed the Newbold CDC and a civic association which gave rise to other area civic groups.

Boundaries

According to their websites, Newbold Civic Association (NCA), created in 2006, and Newbold Neighbors Association (NNA), now East Point Breeze Neighbors (EPBN), created in 2007, dispute the north/south boundaries of the neighborhood. The NCA claims the southern boundary as Wolf Street while EPBN claims the southern boundary as Passyunk Avenue, one to three blocks farther north (variable due to the southwest to northeast orientation of Passyunk).

Community

The main recreation areas in this neighborhood are DiSilvestro Playground and Guerin Recreation Center.

Civic groups active in the area include East Point Breeze Neighbors, Point Breeze Community Development Coalition, Point Breeze Network Plus, Neighbors in Action, Concerned Citizens of Point Breeze, the Newbold Civic Association, the South Broad Street Neighborhood Association, and Diversified Community Services.

Demographics
Based on a Zillow “Home Value Index”, a slideshow released in Nov. 2009 after the real estate market crash on CNBC has two Philly zip codes coming in at second and third place in the U.S. showing strong growth in Newbold during tough times.

Newbold was identified as the fourth "hottest" neighborhood in the Philadelphia region by Redfin.com with a 435% increase in interest in the neighborhood and a $155,750 median home sale price.

Transportation
Newbold is served by the SEPTA Broad Street Line (BSL), accessible at the Snyder, Tasker-Morris, and Ellsworth-Federal Stations, as well as several bus lines.

Namesakes
Newbold IPA, a beer released in 2008 by Philadelphia Brewing Company was named after the neighborhood.

See also

Point Breeze
South Philadelphia
Gentrification

External links
East Point Breeze Neighbors
Newbold Civic Association

References

Neighborhoods in Philadelphia
South Philadelphia